This is a list of films which placed number one at the weekend box office for the year 2022.

Number-one films

References

See also
 Cinema of Germany 

Germany